Sikhanyiso is a South African given name. Notable people with the name include:

Sikhanyiso Dlamini (born 1987), eldest daughter of King Mswati III of Swaziland
Sikhanyiso Ndlovu (1937–2015), Zimbabwean politician and a former Minister of Information and Publicity

African given names